Champion EP is the first EP by Brother Ali. The 9-song EP was released on Rhymesayers Entertainment on May 11, 2004 and is produced by Ant of Atmosphere.

Track listing
"Champion (Remix)" – 4:42
"Bad Ma Fucka" – 4:27
"Sleepwalker" – 3:48
"Love on Display" – 3:28
"Self Taught" – 4:04
"Heads Down (You Haven't Done That Yet)" – 3:59
"Chain Link" – 4:25
"Waheedah's Hands" – 4:04
"Rain Water" – 6:09

References

External links
 Rhymesayers Entertainment

2004 EPs
Rhymesayers Entertainment EPs
Brother Ali albums
Albums produced by Ant (producer)